In American football, the Belgian Bowl is the championship game of the Belgian Football League (BFL). At the end of each regular season, three teams from each conference play in the BFL playoffs, a six-team single-elimination tournament that culminates with the Belgian Bowl.

History

Statistics

 in italics and †: defunct team or old name
 (*) Izeghem Redskins became the West Flanders Tribes.
 (**) Tournai Cardinals became the Tournai Phoenix.
 Bold indicates a still active streak.

References

External links
Official Belgian Bowl site
Official BFL website
Dale's FFL thoughts - FFL Blog

American football in Belgium
American football bowls in Europe
1987 establishments in Belgium
Recurring sporting events established in 1987